Dean Donnell Sturgis (December 1, 1892 – June 29, 1950) was an American Major League Baseball catcher. He played for the Philadelphia Athletics during the  season. He was born in Beloit, Kansas and attended Bucknell University. He also played college baseball and football for the Bucknell Bison. In one college football game in 1913, he helped pull off a win against a then-undefeated Pittsburgh Panthers football team. He was invited to try out for the Philadelphia Athletics while still in college at Bucknell.

References

External links

People from Beloit, Kansas
Bucknell University alumni
Major League Baseball catchers
Philadelphia Athletics players
Baseball players from Kansas
1892 births
1950 deaths